East Asian name may refer to:
Chinese name
Chinese surname
Chinese given name
List of common Chinese surnames
Japanese name
Korean name
List of Korean surnames

Vietnamese name
List of Chinese characters used as surname in all countries of East Asian cultural sphere

See also
Generation name